The Space Nursing Society is an international space advocacy organization devoted to space nursing and space exploration by registered nurses.  The society is an affiliated, non-profit special interest group associated with the National Space Society.

The society was founded in 1991 and has members from around the world including Australia, Canada, Czech Republic, England, Germany, Greece, Scotland and the United States.

The society serves as a forum for the discussion and study of issues related to nursing in space and the impact of these studies on nursing on Earth.

See also 

 Space colonization
 Vision for Space Exploration

References

External links
 Space Nursing Society official website
 National Space Society official website
 Ad Astra online edition

Organizations established in 1991
Non-profit organizations based in California
Space organizations
Nursing organizations
Space nursing